Ivana Moulisová (born 14 July 1953) is a Czech volleyball player. She competed in the women's tournament at the 1972 Summer Olympics.

References

1953 births
Living people
Czech women's volleyball players
Olympic volleyball players of Czechoslovakia
Volleyball players at the 1972 Summer Olympics
Place of birth missing (living people)